Captain Clive Wilson Warman (30 May 1892 – 12 May 1919) was a World War I flying ace credited with twelve aerial victories. He was the sole American winner of the British Distinguished Service Order.

Early life

Clive Wilson Warman was born on 30 May 1892 in Norfolk, Virginia.

World War I

Warman was a civil engineer before World War I. He enlisted in the Princess Patricia's Canadian Light Infantry in Canada on 5 September 1914. They sailed for England in January 1915. Warman's duty with them took him through the Second Battle of Ypres, where he was wounded. After recovery, he was involved in suppressing the Easter Rebellion in Ireland. He then transferred to the Royal Flying Corps in summer 1916. He was so skillful that when he finished pilot training, they temporarily retained him as an instructor. Not until June 1917 was he assigned to a combat squadron, No. 23, to fly a Spad VII. He began his victory string on 6 July 1917. He became a balloon buster and an ace on 9 August 1917, when he destroyed a German observation balloon. He scored double victories on 12 and 15 August. On 16 August, his guns jammed mid-fight with three Germans; in frustration, Warman fired his Very flares at his German opponents; he finally flung a wooden mallet at them. Despite his gun jams, he destroyed a German two-seater and a second observation balloon that day. Two days later, he scored his final win. His final tally was two observation balloons destroyed, two enemy planes driven down out of control, and eight destroyed; one of the latter was shared with Conn Standish O'Grady.

On 22 August 1917, Warman was forced down and wounded in combat. He was under medical care until mid-1918; subsequently, he was assigned to the War Ministry in London for the rest of the war.

Postwar
Postwar, he became a flight commander in the new No. 1 Canadian Squadron. He was injured in a crash on 8 May 1919, and died of his wounds on 12 May 1919.

Honors and awards
Distinguished Service Order (DSO)

2nd Lt. Clive Wilson Warman, M.C., Gen. List and R.F.C.
   
For conspicuous gallantry and devotion to duty. During two days, whilst operating under very difficult conditions in high wind and against strong hostile opposition, he destroyed three enemy machines and a balloon. He displayed the greatest dash and fearlessness in attacking an enemy aerodrome, and on one occasion, when separated from his patrol, and surrounded by 20 hostile machines, he fought his way through, although his machine gun was useless, by attacking them with his "Very" pistol; eventually regaining his own aerodrome with his machine much shot about. His wonderful coolness and courage have on all occasions been beyond praise.
 
Military Cross (MC)

T./2nd Lt. Clive Wilson Warman, Gen. List and R.F.C.
   
For conspicuous gallantry and devotion to duty. He has on all occasions proved himself to be an exceptionally skilful and gallant pilot, having in the space of six weeks brought down six machines and destroyed a hostile balloon. He has also driven down at least five other enemy machines, displaying a consistent determination to attack at close range regardless of personal danger.

See also

 List of World War I flying aces from the United States

References

Bibliography
 American Aces of World War 1 Harry Dempsey. Osprey Publishing, 2001. , .
 

1892 births
1919 deaths
American World War I flying aces
Aviators from Virginia
Burials at Brookwood Cemetery